Scuole Alle Stimate is a middle and high school in the center of Verona, Italy. There is a Classical High School, where the main subjects are Greek and Latin; a Scientific High School where the main subjects are maths and biology; in the Linguistic High School Spanish, German and English are taught.  

The school houses a library which holds a precious collection of books that were bought by the school's founder, Gaspar Bertoni (1777 – 1853); he founded the school in 1816.

External links
 Official school site
 Library website

Schools in Veneto
Education in Verona